Melanism is the congenital excess of melanin in an organism resulting in dark pigment.

Pseudomelanism, also called abundism, is another variant of pigmentation, identifiable by dark spots or enlarged stripes, which cover a large part of the body of the animal, making it appear melanistic.

The morbid deposition of black matter, often of a malignant character causing pigmented tumors, is called melanosis.

Adaptation

Melanism related to the process of adaptation is called adaptive. Most commonly, dark individuals become fitter to survive and reproduce in their environment as they are better camouflaged. This makes some species less conspicuous to predators, while others, such as leopards, use it as a foraging advantage during night hunting. Typically, adaptive melanism is heritable: A dominant allele, which is entirely or nearly entirely expressed in the phenotype, is responsible for the excessive amount of melanin.

Adaptive melanism has been shown to occur in a variety of animals, including mammals such as squirrels, many cats and canids, and coral snakes. Adaptive melanism can lead to the creation of morphs, the most notable example being the peppered moth, whose evolutionary history in the United Kingdom is offered as a classic instructional tool for teaching the principles of natural selection.

Industrial melanism

Industrial melanism is an evolutionary effect in insects such as the peppered moth, Biston betularia in areas subject to industrial pollution. Darker pigmented individuals are favored by natural selection, apparently because they are better camouflaged against polluted backgrounds. When pollution was later reduced, lighter forms regained the advantage and melanism became less frequent. Other explanations have been proposed, such as that the melanin pigment enhances function of immune defences, or a thermal advantage from the darker coloration.

In cats

Melanistic coat coloration occurs as a common polymorphism in 11 of 37 felid species and reaches high population frequency in some cases but never achieves complete fixation. The black panther, a melanistic leopard, is common in the equatorial rainforest of Malaya and the tropical rainforest on the slopes of some African mountains, such as Mount Kenya. The serval also has melanistic forms in certain areas of East Africa. In the jaguarundi, coloration varies from dark brown and gray to light reddish. Melanic forms of jaguar are common in certain parts of South America. In 1938 and 1940, two melanistic bobcats were trapped alive in sub-tropical Florida.

In 2003, the dominant mode of inheritance of melanism in jaguars was confirmed by performing phenotype-transmission analysis in a 116-individual captive pedigree. Melanistic animals were found to carry at least one copy of a mutant MC1R sequence allele, bearing a 15-base pair inframe deletion. Ten unrelated melanistic jaguars were either homozygous or heterozygous for this allele. A 24-base pair deletion causes the incompletely dominant allele for melanism in the jaguarundi. Sequencing of the agouti signalling peptide in the agouti gene coding region revealed a 2-base pair deletion in black domestic cats. These variants were absent in melanistic individuals of Geoffroy's cat, oncilla, pampas cat and Asian golden cat, suggesting that melanism arose independently at least four times in the cat family.

Melanism in leopards is inherited as a Mendelian, monogenic recessive trait relative to the spotted form. Pairings of black animals have a significantly smaller litter size than other possible pairings. Between January 1996 and March 2009, Indochinese leopards were photographed at 16 sites in the Malay Peninsula in a sampling effort of more than 1000 trap nights. Of 445 photographs of melanistic leopards, 410 were taken south of the Kra Isthmus, where the non-melanistic morph was never photographed. These data suggest the near fixation of the dark allele in the region. The expected time to fixation of this recessive allele due to genetic drift alone ranged from about 1,100 years to about 100,000 years.
Melanism in leopards has been hypothesized to be causally associated with a selective advantage for ambush. Other theories are that genes for melanism in felines may provide resistance to viral infections, or a high-altitude adaptation, since black fur absorbs more light for warmth.

In birds

The chicken breeds Silkie and Ayam Cemani commonly exhibit this trait. Ayam Cemani is an uncommon and relatively modern breed of chicken from Indonesia. They have a dominant gene that causes hyperpigmentation (Fibromelanosis), making the chicken entirely black; including feathers, beak, and internal organs.

In April 2015, an extremely rare black flamingo was spotted on the Mediterranean island of Cyprus.

In amphibians
The alpine salamander, Salamandra atra, has one subspecies (S. atra atra) that is completely black. The pigment comes from a specific cell called a melanophore, which produce the compound melanin.

There are four other subspecies of this salamander, and they have varying levels of melanin pigmentation. The subspecies have yellow spots in different concentrations or proportions. The pigment-producing cells that contribute to the yellow spots of some sub-species are called xanthophores. It appears that the fully-black phenotypes do not ever develop these xanthophores. Alpine salamanders produce a toxin from their skin, and both fully melanistic, black salamanders and spotted individuals produce the compound.

Studies done that traced DNA histories have suggested that the original alpine salamander phenotype was black with some yellow spots, meaning that the fully black color evolved over time and was thus selected for over many generations.

In humans
Melanism, meaning a mutation that results in completely dark skin, does not exist in humans. Melanin is the primary determinant of the degree of skin pigmentation and protects the body from harmful ultraviolet radiation. The same ultraviolet radiation is essential for the synthesis of vitamin D in skin, so lighter colored skin – less melanin – is an adaptation related to the prehistoric movement of humans away from equatorial regions, as there is less exposure to sunlight at higher latitudes. People from parts of Africa, South Asia, Southeast Asia, and Australia may have very dark skin, but this is not melanism.

Peutz–Jeghers syndrome

This rare genetic disorder is characterized by the development of macules with hyperpigmentation on the lips and oral mucosa (melanosis), as well as benign polyps in the gastrointestinal tract.

Socio-politics

The term melanism has been used on Usenet, internet forums and blogs to mean an African-American social movement holding that dark-skinned humans are the original people from which those of other skin color originate. The term melanism has been used in this context as early as the mid-1990s and was promoted by some Afrocentrists, such as Frances Cress Welsing.

See also
 Albinism
 Albino and white squirrels
 Amelanism
 Black squirrel
 Black swan
 Erythrism
 Isabellinism
 Heterochromia iridum
 Leucism, a partial loss of pigmentation that results in animals with pale or white skin, hair and/or feathers
 Piebaldism
 Vitiligo, a skin condition which causes areas of the skin to lose its colour
 Xanthochromism, an unusual yellow colouration in animals
 Peutz–Jeghers syndrome
 Ocular melanosis
 Melanosis

References

Bibliography

 
 
 
 Melanism and disease resistance in insects
 Fryer, G. 2013. How should the history of industrial melanism in moths be interpreted? The Linnean. 29 (2): 15 - 22.

Genetic disorders with no OMIM
Disturbances of pigmentation
Dermatologic terminology
Animal coat colors